Adina Mandlová (28 January 1910 – 16 June 1991) was a Czech stage and film actress. She was one of the leading stars of 1930s and 1940s Czech cinema. She was involved in a number of scandals and love affairs.

Life and career

Early days
She was born Jarmila Anna Františka Marie Mandlová in a middle-class family in Mladá Boleslav. Her father Jan Mandl was a talented pianist who wanted to study music in Vienna, but when his father died, he became a railway inspector. He married his first wife and had two sons – Jan and Karel. When his wife died of tuberculosis, he married Mandlová's mother Anna Krýžová. She was an innkeeper's daughter. Together they had a son Jiří, and finally a daughter Adina. Her father chose her name inspired by Gaetano Donizetti's opera L'elisir d'amore. He made Adina listen to classical music and to play the piano. When she was 7 years old, her father died of Spanish influenza. After his death her mother made Adina stop playing the piano. The family struggled financially, so her mother was stealing food from their neighbour Václav Klement's garden. After that her mother rented rooms in their house to students. Adina was sent to study at a boarding school in France at Paris, but was expelled before graduation. She got pregnant there and had an abortion. She returned home and become a secretary. Her film career started in 1932 thanks to a small part in film Děvčátko, neříkej ne!, where she performed as a model. In 1932 she met an actor Hugo Haas, who became her partner. He cast her cast in his movie Life Is a Dog in 1933. She worked as a model for a fashion designer Ulli Rosenbaum. Haas made her to refuse the main role in Gustav Machatý's movie Ecstasy (1933), which made Hedy Lamarr famous. They broke up in 1937. The movie Holka nebo kluk? (1938) was commercially very successful and made her the leading actress in Czechoslovakia.

Stardom
In the late 1930s and early 1940s she made her best movies by her own account – Virginity, Kouzelný dům or Nocturnal Butterfly. During the early 1940s and Second World War Mandlová dated German film director Willy Söhnel of Barrandov Studios. After a false rumour that she also dated a Reichsprotektor Karl Hermann Frank, her public image suffered. She was asked to act in a German movie I Entrust My Wife to You in 1942. She accepted the offer after the actor Heinz Rühmann came to meet her. Joseph Goebbels told her, that Hitler did not approve of Slavic sounding names in German movies and the name "Mandl" sounded too Jewish. The next day Mandlová found out she would be known as Lil Adina, a name that Goebbels personally chose for her. After the shooting was finished Frank sent a letter to Goebbels objecting that Mandlová should be cast in German films. Following the letter she was blacklisted from German and also Czech movies and acted only in theatres. She married a painter and ardent communist Zdeněk Tůma to silence the rumors about her and Frank. In 1943 she was finally cast in her next movie Happy Journey. After her husband committed suicide, she had a breakdown. In 1944 she fell in love with a married actor Vladimír Šmeral, her theatre colleague. She got pregnant, but after Šméral was transported to a concentration camp and she learned he planned to stay with his wife, she suffered a miscarriage. Nevertheless, she helped to hide Šméral until the end of the war when he escaped from the concentration camp. After the war Mandlová was arrested for suspicion she had become a German citizen. She was charged with collaboration and after two months sentenced to the time served.

Career in UK
She was offered a role in Basil Dearden's movie Saraband for Dead Lovers, but a Communist Minister of Information Václav Kopecký refused to give her a passport. She married a Czech flight engineer Josef Kočvárek who had British citizenship and moved to UK in 1947. There she continued her acting career with only a moderate success. In 1948, she acted in the movie The Fool and the Princess. She fell in love with her co-star Bruce Lester and got divorced. Lester soon moved back to Hollywood and Mandlová stayed in England. Later she dated a producer Alexander Korda. She married a wealthy Englishman named Geoffrey, but immediately regretted it and the marriage ended in divorce after two years. In 1950 Mandlová got ill with tuberculosis and left to get a treatment in Switzerland. She then worked in Radio Free Europe and later as a secretary of a fashion designer Ben Pearson, whom she married in 1954. During the 1960s, she had small roles in the British TV shows Ghost Squad (in the episode "Rich Ruby Wine") and The Saint (in the episode "The Rhine Maiden") and continued acting in theatres. She also started sculpting.

Later years
Afterwards, she retired with Pearson to Malta, where she wrote her autobiography Dnes se tomu směju in 1977. In 1981 they moved to Canada. After the death of her husband, Mandlová, already very ill, moved back to Czechoslovkia in 1991.

She died on 16 June 1991.

Filmography

 Děvčátko, neříkej ne! (1932) as Model
 Diagnosa X (1933) as Helena
 Life Is a Dog (1933) as Eva Durdysová
 V tom domečku pod Emauzy (1933) as Apolenka Dudková / Komtesa Lubecká
 The Little Pet (1934) as Marcella Johnová
 Nezlobte dědečka (1934) as Liduška
 Long Live with Dearly Departed (1935) as Alice Machová
 Svatá lež (1935)
 The Comedian's Princess (1936) as Lexová
 The Seamstress (1936) as Mici, Lorraine's lover
 Děvčata, nedejte se! (1937) as Vlasta
 Rozkošný příběh (1937) as Eva Randová
 Morality Above All Else (1937) as Eva Karasová, daughter
 The World Is Ours (1937) as Markétka, newscaster
 Poručík Alexander Rjepkin (1937) as Mathilda von Kiesewetter
 Virginity (1937) as Lili
 Blackmailer (1937) as Máša Lírová
 Kvočna (1937) as Katynka Svatá
 Harmonika (1937) as Elsa, Müller's girlfriend
 Důvod k rozvodu (1937) as Helena
 Krok do tmy (1938) as Eva Hallerová
 Ducháček Will Fix It (1938) as Julie z Rispaldic
 Svatební cesta (1938) as Káťa Holanová
 Druhé mládí (1938) as Fan Tobisová
 Bilá vrána (1938) as Jana Dubanská
 The Merry Wives (1938) as Rozina
 U pokladny stál... (1939) as Věra
 Camel Through the Eye of a Needle (1939) as Nina Štěpánová
 Nevinná (1939) as Jarmila Černá-Nováková
 Christian' (1939) as Zuzana Rendlová
 Hvězda z poslední stace (1939) as Emilka
 The Magic House (1939) as Marie Ungrová
 Holka nebo kluk? (1939) as Ada Bártů
 The Catacombs (1940) as Nasťa Borková
 Dva týdny stěstí (1940) as Marta
 The Minister's Girlfriends (1940) as Julie Svobodová
 Pacientka Dr. Hegla (1940) as Karla Janotová
 Blue Star Hotel (1941) as Milada Landová
 Nocturnal Butterfly (1941) as Anča, called Kiki
 From the Czech Mills (1941) as Lola
 Těžký život dobrodruha (1941) as Helena Rohanová
 Okouzlená (1942) as Milada Jánská
 The Great Dam (1942) as Irena Berková
 Šťastnou cestu (1943) as Helena Truxová
 I Entrust My Wife to You (1943) as Ellinor Deinhardt
 Bláhový sen (1943) as Dida Kanská-Valentová
 Sobota (1945) as Luisa Herbertová
 The Fool and the Princess (1949) as Moura
 Summer Day's Dream (1949) as Irina Shestova
 The Master Builder'' (1950) as Hilda Wangel

References

External links 

1910 births
1991 deaths
People from Mladá Boleslav
People from the Kingdom of Bohemia
Czech film actresses
Czechoslovak film actresses
Czech stage actresses
Czechoslovak stage actresses
20th-century Czech actresses